The New Orleans City Council is the legislative branch of the City of New Orleans, Louisiana, United States. The current mayor-council form of city government was created in 1954, following the 1950 amendment of the state constitution that provided for a home rule charter for the city. The 1954 Charter provided for seven members, five elected from single-member districts, and two elected at-large, replacing the 1912 Charter, which provided for a commission form of government with a mayor and four commissioners.

The council members are elected to four-year terms, using the two-round system. The President and the Vice President of the Council are chosen by the council at its organizational meeting on the day members take office following the election. The President is elected from the two at-large members; any of the other members of the Council may be elected Vice President.

Members
The current members of the New Orleans City Council:

Officers:
President: Helena Moreno

All 7 members of the council are Democrats

Council members under the 1954 Charter

Under the 1954 Charter, council members are elected to four-year terms that begin on the first Monday in May following the election, except that a councilmember elected to fill a vacancy serves only for the remainder of the unexpired term. Vacancies that occur less than one year before the end of the term may be filled by appointment; vacancies of a year or longer are filled by special election, and that vacancy may be filled by appointment for the period before the special election.
After the regular 1970 elections, a redistricting dispute delayed the next regular Council elections until 1976, and the following regular Council election was held in 1978.
Effective in 1991, a council member who has served more than one and a half terms in two consecutive terms may not be elected to the office for the following term.
Beginning in 2014 the at-large seats are voted on as separate offices, designated as Division 1 and Division 2.
Effective June 1, 2018, the terms of office begin on the second Monday in January following the election.

Office holders for terms before 2022 and reference notes for those office holders are from the City Archives at the New Orleans Public Library. Office holders for the 2022-2026 term are from the Louisiana Secretary of State election results for the November 13, 2021, general election and the December 11, 2021, runoff election.

Earlier members, under the commission form of government
A. Brown Moore (Public utilities commissioner, 1950-1954)
Lionel Ott (Finance commissioner, 1946-1954)

References

External links
New Orleans City Council Homepage

City Council

City councils in the United States